Hisban is a town in the Amman Governorate of north-western Jordan. Tell Hisban is one of a few possible locations thought to be biblical Heshbon.

References

External links
Satellite map at Maplandia.com

Populated places in Amman Governorate